Parois Airdrome,  was a temporary World War I airfield in France.  It was located near the commune of Aubréville, in the Lorraine region in northeastern France.

Overview
The airfield was built during the early fall of 1918 as a forward operations base, and was used during the last days of the war by the United States First Army Air Service V Corps Observation Group during the Meuse-Argonne Offensive.   Two squadrons of aircraft operated from the field, primarily taking aerial photography, performing battlefield adjustments and making artillery adjustments.   It likely consisted of a few tents and perhaps some canvas and steel-tubing hangars.   After the 11 November Armistice, the Group was reassigned to the Rhineland as part of the Third Army of Occupation and Parois Airdrome was turned over to the French Government.
Almost at the same time, two French "escadrilles", BR 214 and SPA 215, were stationed at Parois, flying missions for US First Army (they were actually French Second Army Air Service, which Army was fighting under American command). They moved away on 25 November 1918.

Subsequently, the airfield was returned to agricultural use.  Its exact location in the Parois area is undetermined.

Known units assigned
 50th Aero Squadron (Observation with I Corps Obs. Group) 28 November - 6 December 1918
 Headquarters, V Corps Observation Group, 4–11 November 1918
 99th Aero Squadron (Observation) 4–31 November 1918
 104th Aero Squadron (Observation) 4–30 November 1918

See also

 List of Air Service American Expeditionary Force aerodromes in France

References

 Series "D", Volume 2, Squadron histories,. Gorrell's History of the American Expeditionary Forces Air Service, 1917–1919, National Archives, Washington, D.C.

External links

World War I sites of the United States
World War I airfields in France